Night on Bald Mountain is a play by Australian writer Patrick White.

The action takes place during twenty-four hours on isolated Bald Mountain beyond Sydney. White had called it the first true Australian tragedy.

It premiered in March 1964 by the University of Adelaide Theatre Guild for the as yet unestablished "Fringe" alongside the Adelaide Festival of the Arts that year.

Later major productions include a 1996 Company B Belvoir (Sydney) & State Theatre Company of South Australia production directed by Neil Armfield, and a 2014 Malthouse Theatre (Melbourne) production directed by Matthew Lutton.

Original cast 
The cast for the premiere consisted of:

 Nita Pannell as Miss Quodling
 Alexander Archdale as Professor Hugo Sword
 Joan Bruce as Miriam Sword
 Barbara West as Stella Summerhayes
 Myra Noblett as Mrs Sibley
 James Hind as Cantwell
 Robert Leach as Denis Braig
 Don Barker as Second Hiker
 Laurie Davies as First Hiker

Further reading
AusStage search - Searching by the title shows Australian performances, linking to further details.

References

External links
 

1964 plays
Plays by Patrick White